Carlo Pisani (died 1587) was a Roman Catholic prelate who served as Bishop of Torcello (1579–1587).

Biography
On 26 Aug 1579, Carlo Pisani was appointed during the papacy of Pope Gregory XIII as Bishop of Torcello.
He served as Bishop of Torcello until his death in 1587.

References

External links and additional sources
 (for Chronology of Bishops) 
 (for Chronology of Bishops) 

16th-century Roman Catholic bishops in the Republic of Venice
Bishops appointed by Pope Gregory XIII
1579 births
1587 deaths
Pisani family